The economy of Moldova is an emerging upper-middle income economy, with a high Human Development Index. Moldova is a landlocked Eastern European country, bordered by Ukraine on the East and Romania to the West. It is a former Soviet republic and today a candidate member to the European Union.

Background

On January 2, 1992, Moldova introduced a market economy, liberalising prices, which resulted in huge inflation. In 1993, a national currency, the Moldovan leu, was introduced to replace the Soviet rouble.  The economic fortunes of Moldova began to change in 2001; since then the country has seen a steady annual growth of between 5% and 10%. Remittances from Moldovans abroad account for a quarter of Moldova's GDP, one of the highest percentages in the world.

Overview

Moldova's proximity to the Black Sea gives it a mild and sunny climate. The fertile Chernozem soil supports wheat, corn, barley, tobacco, sugar beet, and soybeans. Beef and dairy cattle are raised, and beekeeping is widespread. Moldova's best-known product comes from its extensive and well-developed vineyards concentrated in the central and southern regions. Moldova produces liqueur and sparkling wine. It is also known for its sunflower seeds, walnuts, apples, and other fruits. This makes the area ideal for agriculture and food processing, which accounts for about 40% of the country's GDP.

Moldova produced in 2018:

 2.0 million tons of maize;
 1.1 million tons of wheat;
 788 thousand tons of sunflower seed;
 730 thousand tons of grape;
 707 thousand tons of sugar beet (the beet is used to manufacture sugar and ethanol);
 665 thousand tons of apple;
 175 thousand tons of barley;
 174 thousand tons of potato;
 132 thousand tons of plum;

In addition to smaller productions of other agricultural products, like rapeseed (85 thousand tons). Moldova has a production of grape and apple between the 20th and 25th largest in the world, and a production of plum and sunflower seed between the 10th and 15th largest of the world.

Moldova has experienced economic difficulties, like many other former Soviet republics. Since its economy was highly dependent on the rest of the former Soviet Union for energy and raw materials, the breakdown in trade following the breakup of the Soviet Union had a serious effect, exacerbated at times by drought and civil conflict. The Russian rouble devaluation of  1998 had a deleterious effect on Moldova's economy, but economic growth has been steady since 2000.

Moldova has made progress in economic reform since independence. The government has liberalized most prices and has phased out subsidies on most basic consumer goods. A program begun in March 1993 has privatized 80% of all housing units and nearly 2,000 small, medium, and large enterprises, which led to a rise in homelessness and unemployment. Other successes include the privatization of nearly all of Moldova's agricultural land from state to private ownership, as a result of an American assistance program completed in 2000. A stock market opened in June 1995.

Inflation was brought down from over 105% in 1994 to 11% in 1997. Though inflation spiked again after Russia’s  1998 currency devaluation, Moldova made great strides in bringing it under control: 18.4% in 2000, 6.3% in 2001, and 4.4% in 2002. In 2003 inflation escalated again – due mainly to a drought-driven rise in agricultural prices – reaching 15.7%, although it was reined in to 12.5% in 2004. The local currency appreciated considerably in 2003 and the first months of 2004. By May, the leu had reached its highest level since the end of 1999. After the National Bank of Moldova increased considerably its purchases on the foreign exchange market, the leu stabilized in November–December 2004 at 12.00-12.50 to the US dollar.

Moldova continues transitioning towards a free-market economy. The country recorded its fifth consecutive year of positive GDP growth in 2004, with year-end real GDP growth of 8%. This growth is impressive considering that, prior to 2000, Moldova had recorded only one year of positive GDP growth since independence. Budget execution in 2004 was also impressive, as actual consolidated budget revenues exceeded projections by 1.4% for most of the year.

Privatization results in 2004 were not significant: several smaller companies and one winery were privatized in 2004, but the government postponed indefinitely the privatization of several larger state enterprises, including two electricity distribution companies. Sporadic and ineffective enforcement of the law, economic and political uncertainty, and government harassment and interference continue to discourage inflows of foreign direct investment.

Imports continued to increase more rapidly than exports during the first nine months of 2004; Moldova’s terms of trade worsened, as higher-priced energy imports outpaced the value of Moldova’s main exports—agricultural and agro-processing goods.

During 2002, Moldova rescheduled an outstanding Eurobond, in the amount of $39.6 million, to avoid a potential default. In May 2004, Moldova redeemed promissory notes with a total value of $114.5 million to Russian Gazprom for just $50 million. Moldova informed its bilateral creditors in mid-2003 that it would no longer service its debts. The 2004 budget did provide funds for external debt service (interest) at some 6% of the government budget, the 2005 budget projects external debt service at some 4%. The International Monetary Fund (IMF) and World Bank resumed lending to Moldova in July 2002, and then suspended lending again in July 2003. Although Moldova passed a poverty reduction strategy in 2004, it has yet to reach an agreement with international financial institutions.

70% of total electrical energy power consumed in Moldova is imported from Ukraine and only 30% is produced in Moldova.

Macroeconomic situation 

As a whole, Moldova is doing well, despite a series of consecutive shocks, which included the doubling of the price of imported natural gas and 2006 Russian ban of Moldovan and Georgian wines, and a severe drought in 2007. Growth is estimated at 5 percent in 2007 and is projected to increase to 7 percent in 2008. Investment is picking up, and is beginning to replace remittances as the main source of growth—an encouraging sign that the earlier model of consumption-driven growth is changing.

Moldova increasingly faces the challenges experienced by other transition economies. Improved growth prospects have come with strong appreciation pressures from foreign exchange inflows, and a widening trade deficit. Foreign direct investment (FDI) has picked up and is estimated to have reached 12 percent of GDP in 2007, compared with 7 percent in 2006.

The main macroeconomic concern is inflation, which at 13 percent remains high for the region.

A deterioration in the merchandise trade balance due to strong import growth has been offset by improvements in net income and transfers, with a small improvement in the current account deficit to 12 percent of GDP. A resumption of wine exports to Russia in October was a major positive development, although volumes are likely to recover slowly.

Fiscal policy remained tight, ending 2007 with a modest deficit of 0.3 percent of GDP. Strong revenue performance was driven by robust VAT on imports, while expenditure was kept in line with the budget. However, the tax cuts introduced in 2008 may undermine the favorable fiscal position.

Monetary tightening in 2007 was complicated by the strong inflow of foreign exchange. The National Bank of Moldova increased reserve requirements from 10 to 15 percent, and raised policy interest rates by 2.5 percentage points. Nevertheless, the possibility of second-round effects from the drought, liquidity pressures from growing remittances and FDI, and the continued strong growth in credit and broad money suggest that upside risks to inflation are not yet fully contained.

In spite of some favorable background, Moldova remains Europe's poorest nation, resisting pursuing the types of reforms that have vastly improved the economies of some of its Eastern European neighbors. The Communist Party retained political control after winning the March 2005 parliamentary elections and re-elected its leader, Vladimir Voronin, as president in collaboration with the opposition. Although the government maintains a pro-Western stance, it has had trouble pursuing structural reforms and has made little progress on the International Monetary Fund's program to attract external financial resources. The parliament approved the government's economic growth and strategy paper in December 2004, but international financial institutions and Western investors will not be satisfied until the government begins to address fiscal adjustment, wage restraint, and payment of debt arrears. Despite the fact that the pace of privatization and industrial output has slowed, GDP growth was 7.3 percent in 2004, consumption continues to grow, and the currency continues to appreciate. The impasse in the pro-Russian Transnistria enclave, plagued by corruption and the smuggling of arms and contraband, continues despite international attempts at mediation.

Business and economic environment
According to the 2020 Index of Economic Freedom, Moldova ranks 85th globally with the overall score of 62.5, an increase of 0.5 relative to 2020.

*Everything above 60 is considered to be Moderately Free.

According to the 2020 Ease of Doing Business Index, Moldova's Distance to Frontier is 74.4/100 (48th globally), an increase of 1.3 relative to 2019.

*DTF (Distance to Frontier): Higher is better

Trade policy 
According to the World Bank, Moldova's weighted average tariff rate in 2001 (the most recent year for which World Bank data are available) was 2.8 percent. (The World Bank has revised the figure for 2001 downward from the 3.9 percent reported in the 2005 Index.) A 2004 World Bank report notes a "range of informal barriers to both imports and exports in Moldova, such as cumbersome and restrictive trade procedures, corruption, burdensome and inappropriate regulations and high transport costs." Based on the revised trade factor methodology, Moldova's trade policy score is unchanged.

Free Trade Agreements
Currently Moldova has signed multilateral and bilateral Free Trade Agreements with 43 countries.

Regional developments 
Countries tend to benefit from sharing borders with developed markets as this facilitates trade and development. Below is a table of Moldova's neighboring countries, their GDP per capita in 1990 and 2015, and trade values between the pairs. Their evolution is distinct as Romania went from a GDP per capita which was only about a third larger than that of Moldova's in 1990 to one which in 2015 is more than four times as large. Ukraine on the other hand decreased its advantage over Moldova by almost 6pc. This is evident in trade as the value of exports to  Ukraine is only about 10pc that of exports to Romania.

Fiscal burden 
Moldova's top income tax rate is 22 percent. The top corporate tax rate has been cut to 18 percent from 20 percent, effective January 2005. In 2003, government expenditures as a share of GDP increased 1.2 percentage points to 33.6 percent, compared to the 3.0 percentage point increase in 2002.

Government intervention 
The World Bank reports that the government consumed 17.7 percent of GDP in 2003. In the same year, based on data from the International Monetary Fund, Moldova received 4.93 percent of its revenues from state-owned enterprises and government ownership of property.

Monetary policy 
Between 1995 and 2004, Moldova's weighted average annual rate of inflation was 11.99 percent.

Foreign investment 
The Moldovan government does not maintain many formal barriers to foreign investment, and the Moldovan embassy reports that foreign investors are free to "place their investments throughout the Republic of Moldova, in any area of business activity, as long as it does not go against the interests of the national security, anti-monopoly legislation, environment protection norms, public health and public order." However, there are significant informal barriers and indications that the formal reasons to block investment are liberally applied. According to the International Monetary Fund, "despite efforts to simplify licensing and business registration, there has been no significant improvement in the business climate. Moreover, the privatization program has stalled, while corruption remains widespread and governance weak. Government interference in the private sector…casts doubt over the authorities' commitment to market-oriented reforms." The Economist Intelligence Unit reports that the "poor investment climate, including annulments of some earlier sales, continues to deter many Western investors. Between 2001 and 2004 the government privatized less than 60 of the 480-odd enterprises scheduled for sale." Foreign investors may not purchase agricultural or forest land. The IMF reports that both residents and non-residents may hold foreign exchange accounts, but approval is required in some cases. Payments and transfers require supporting documentation and approval of the National Bank of Moldova if they exceed specified amounts. Nearly all capital transactions require approval by or registration with the National Bank of Moldova.

Banking and finance 

There are no official barriers to founding foreign banks or branches in Moldova. The central bank has increased the minimum capital requirement, which is expected to contribute to consolidation in the banking sector. First Initiative reports that the banking sector "consists of 16 commercial banks (2003). There are 14 locally-owned banks, while the two remaining ones are from Russia and Romania. The banking sector is highly concentrated with the five largest banks accounting for over 70% of lending in 2002. Unlike the banking sector, the insurance sector has high levels of foreign-participation. The largest insurance firm in Moldova, the former state insurance company, is owned by an Australian company." Moldova's stock exchange is very small, listing fewer than 25 companies in 2002. The Moldovan embassy reports that the government holds shares in two banks—JSCB "Banca de Economii" SA and JSCB "EuroCreditBank"—including a controlling share of Banca de Economii. The Economist Intelligence Unit reports that foreign investment accounts for approximately 50 percent of total banking capital.

Wages and prices 
The government influences prices through the large state-owned sector. According to the Ministry of Economy, the state regulates the prices of goods and services provided by monopolies and the prices of electric or thermal energy, land, medical services, and services offered by local tax regions. Moldova has two legal monthly minimum wages: one wage for state employees and another, higher wage for the private sector.

In 2015, the average monthly salary in the economy was MDL 4611 (approx. 210 EUR / 235 USD), up by 10.5% (0.7% inflation adjusted) against 2014.

In December 2015 the average salary for state employees was MDL 4162 and the average salary in private sector was MDL 5684, up by 4.0% and 8.6% against 2014 respectively.

Property rights 
The U.S. Department of Commerce reports that the "legal system has improved in recent years. Moldova has a documented and consistently applied commercial law." Nevertheless, much more needs to be done. According to the U.S. Department of State, "The Constitution provides for an independent judiciary; however, the executive branch has exerted undue influence on the judiciary. Many observers believe that arrears in salary payments also make it difficult for judges to remain independent from outside influences and free from corruption."

Regulation 
"Bureaucratic procedures are not always transparent and red tape often makes processing unnecessarily long," reports the U.S. Department of Commerce. "[C]ommercial law is a confusing patchwork of narrow statutes and an outdated civil code. With USAID experts, a draft civil code has been developed which follows the current European practice of incorporating commercial law provisions." The same source reports that anti-corruption laws "are not effectively enforced and corruption exists at an advanced level." A report provided by the World Bank indicates that labor laws are somewhat rigid.

Informal market 
Transparency International's 2004 score for Moldova is 2.3. Thereafter, Moldova's informal market score is 4 in 2005.
In 2011 the corruption score for Moldova is 2.9, better than it was in 2004, concluding TI.

Tourism
Tourism in Moldova
Total:  234,200 in 2016
International Tourism:  192,920
Inbound:  15,668
 - 22.7%
 - 11.9%
 - 10.6%
 - 10.0%
 - 4.9%
Outbound:  177,252
 - 31.9%
 - 26.7%
 - 14.1%
 - 13.2%
 - 2.8%
Domestic Tourism:  41,297

There are around 15,000 sights and 300 natural zones within Moldova, which represent a potential for domestic and international tourists.

Statistics

(e) - estimate

Moldovan economy in graphics

Industrial production growth rate:
3.4% (2017)
Agricultural production growth rate:
2.5% (2018)

See also
Economy of Europe
Moldova

References

External links
National Bureau of Statistics of Moldova
National Bank of Moldova
International Monetary Fund: Republic of Moldova: Statistical Appendix

 
Moldova
Moldova